Professor Marin Drinov Elementary School is a school in Panagyurishte, central Bulgaria. It is the biggest school in the town with more than 1,100 pupils.

External links
 Website of the school 
 

Schools in Bulgaria
Panagyurishte
Buildings and structures in Pazardzhik Province